Muskallonge Lake State Park is a state park located in Luce County in the U.S. state of Michigan.

The park encompasses  between the shores of Lake Superior and Muskallonge Lake where Native Americans once had an encampment and where a station of the United States Life-Saving Service once stood.

History
The park occupies land just west of Deer Park, a 19th-century mill town that all but disappeared once the forests on which its mill depended were gone. The state park is also the site of former Station Muskallong Lake (Coast Guard Station #295; later called Station Deer Park), one of five such stations along the coast of Lake Superior between Munising and Whitefish Point  in the Upper Peninsula. It was part of U.S. Life-Saving Service District 10 (later part of District 11). The other four stations along Lake Superior's "Shipwreck Coast" were Grand Marais, Two Heart, Crisp Point Light, and Vermilion Point.

Deer Park Life-Saving Station was in service from 1876 to 1909. The park was transferred from the Forestry Division to Parks and Recreation Division in 1957.

Activities and amenities
The park offers swimming and fishing and includes a 159-site campground, boat launch, picnic area, playground, and trails for hiking and snow-mobiling. The park has the darkest skies for a state park in the entire state of Michigan, which makes the state park a great place for astronomy.

Images

See also
List of lifesaving stations in Michigan

References

External links
Muskallonge Lake State Park Michigan Department of Natural Resources
Muskallonge Lake State Park Map Michigan Department of Natural Resources

State parks of Michigan
Protected areas of Luce County, Michigan
Protected areas established in 1956
1956 establishments in Michigan
IUCN Category III